Schistonisi ("cleaved island"), also called Schisto, and Trachili, is a small islet off the southern coast of Crete in the Libyan Sea. The islet is located south-west of the town of Palaiochora. Administratively, it is located within the municipality of Pelekanos, in Chania regional unit.

See also
List of islands of Greece

Landforms of Chania (regional unit)
Uninhabited islands of Crete
Islands of Greece